The Belarus women's national tennis team represented Belarus in Billie Jean King Cup tennis competition and are governed by the Belarus Tennis Association. They compete in the World Group. After the 2022 Russia invasion of Ukraine, the International Tennis Federation suspended Russia and Belarus from Billie Jean King Cup competitions.

History

1994–2010: Early years
Prior to 1993, Belarusian players competed for the Soviet Union. Belarus competed in its first Fed Cup as an independent nation in 1994, when they achieved their best result by reaching the World Group 1st Round. For the next three years, the team competed in Europe/Africa Zonal Group I. In 1999, Belarus defeated Venezuela to reach World Group II. After spending one year at that level, the team was relegated to Europe/Africa Zonal Group I once again.

Belarus spent another four years at the Europe Arica Zonal Group I before reaching a World Group Play-off in 2004, where they lost to Slovakia in what was their last opportunity for promotion from the zonal level until 2011.

2011–2017: Resurgence and World Group Final
With the help of four players ranked in the WTA top-200 at the end of 2010, Belarus defeated Estonia to return to World Group II, before immediately suffering back-to-back losses to the United States and Switzerland and being once again relegated to Europe/Africa Zonal Group I play. After several years competing at that level, the team was promoted to World Group II by defeating Japan in 2015.

Belarus defeated Canada in their 2016 World Group II tie. This victory secured a spot in the 2016 World Group Play-offs, where they upset Russia 3–2. Belarus competed in the 2017 Fed Cup World Group, where they scored upsets against Netherlands in the quarterfinals and Switzerland in the semifinals. Belarus hosted the 2017 Fed Cup Final against the United States, which they lost 3-2.

2022: Suspension
After the 2022 Russia invasion of Ukraine, the International Tennis Federation suspended Russia and Belarus from Billie Jean King Cup competitions.

Current team
Most recent year-end rankings are used.

Players

Captains 

 Simon Kagan (1994)
 Marat Zverev (1995–1998)
 Natalia Zvereva (1999)
 Igor Tikhonko (2000)
 Anatoli Yakauleu (2001–2002)
 Simon Kagan (2003)
 Yuri Scherbakou (2004)
 Dmitri Tatur (2005–2008)
 Natalia Zvereva (2009)
 Vladimir Voltchkov (2010)
 Sergei Teterin (2011)
 Alexander Skrypko (2012)
 Tatiana Poutchek (2013–2015)
 Eduard Dubrou (2016–2018)
 Tatiana Poutchek (2018–present)

Results

By decade
Here is the list of all match-ups since 1994, when Belarus started competing as a separate nation.

1994–1999

2000–2009

2010–2021

Notes

References

External links
 

Billie Jean King Cup teams
Billie Jean King Cup
Billie Jean King Cup